The Barnes County Courthouse in Valley City, North Dakota was built in 1925.  "It is one of
three distinctive county buildings in North Dakota (the others Ward and Burke counties)
which were designed by the Minneapolis, Minnesota, firm Toltz, King, and Day."

It was listed on the National Register of Historic Places in 1985.

The courthouse has Doric columns.  On the frieze is inscribed: "BUILT FOR THE PEOPLE OF BARNES COUNTY TO PERPETUATE ORDER AND JUSTICE".

References

Courthouses on the National Register of Historic Places in North Dakota
County courthouses in North Dakota
Neoclassical architecture in North Dakota
Government buildings completed in 1925
National Register of Historic Places in Barnes County, North Dakota
1925 establishments in North Dakota